Judith Crow House, also known as Henry Bohlke House, is a historic home located in Cape Girardeau, Missouri. It was built about 1864, and is a one and a half story, painted brick dwelling decorated in the German Vernacular style.  It features two arched, double hung, two over two windows, ornamental brick work, and a recessed doorway. The building is nicknamed after Judith Crow, who bought the house in 1963.

It was listed on the National Register of Historic Places in 1997 as the House at 323 Themis Street. It is located in the Courthouse-Seminary Neighborhood Historic District.

References

Individually listed contributing properties to historic districts on the National Register in Missouri
Houses on the National Register of Historic Places in Missouri
Houses completed in 1864
Houses in Cape Girardeau County, Missouri
National Register of Historic Places in Cape Girardeau County, Missouri